Oscar Theisen (born 1897, date of death unknown) was a Luxembourgian wrestler. He competed in the Greco-Roman light heavyweight event at the 1920 Summer Olympics.

References

External links
 

1897 births
Year of death missing
Olympic wrestlers of Luxembourg
Wrestlers at the 1920 Summer Olympics
Luxembourgian male sport wrestlers
Place of birth missing